Smith Cho is an American actress and realtor of Korean descent. She has appeared in movies, on television and in commercials.

Career

Acting
Cho has appeared in such movies as Bad Boys II, Norbit, Fired Up, and Blades of Glory, and had a lead role in Ping Pong Playa. She has had numerous roles on television, including a starring role in Emily's Reasons Why Not, and has appeared in over 25 commercials. Cho also played Zoe Chae in the 2008 NBC series Knight Rider.

In 2009 Cho appeared on Ugly Betty as an editor who shares Betty's office. In September 2009, Cho was cast as series regular Leslie in the NBC situation comedy 100 Questions. In 2012, Cho appeared in a recurring role in the hour-long ABC drama Jane by Design.

Cho appeared in NBC's 2011 pilot Lovelives.

Other work

Cho works as a real estate agent in the Los Angeles area.

In 2021 she opened a liquor store in Brentwood, Los Angeles.

Filmography

Film

Television

References

External links
Official site (realty)
Official Instagram

Brief article in Variety
Brief biography

Year of birth missing (living people)
Living people
American film actresses
American television actresses
21st-century American actresses
American actresses of Korean descent